Almerindo Portfolio (23 May 1878 – 23 January 1966) was an Italian-born American banker and financier. He was treasurer of New York City under Mayor Fiorello La Guardia. He was an immigrant from Schiavi di Abruzzo, Italy in 1888.
 
In 1908 he legally changed his name from Almerindo Porfilio.

Portfolio rose from a $2-a-week messenger to the presidency of the Bank of Sicily in New York and the head of a cloak & suit company, that in 1924 he gifted to six employees. He also worked as a newspaper publisher, commodity trader, and investment banker.

Between 1917 and 1919 he paid 300,000 Lira ($1.5 million in 2006 US dollars) to install the first electric service in his home town of Schiavi di Abruzzo, Italy. He later gave 50,000 Lira ($255,000 in 2006 US dollars) for the town's water utilities.

In 1940 Portfolio was a delegate to the Republican National Convention. In 1945 he was a member of a joint committee of influential Italian Americans promoting Allied status for Italy in World War II.

Portfolio died on January 25, 1966, at the age of 88, in Gabriels, in upstate New York, at a tuberculosis cure facility.

Portfolio’s brother in law and biographer was diplomat Paolo Alberto Rossi.

See also
List of Italian Americans

References

External links
Official website
 Biography, in Italian: La Vita di Almerindo Portfolio, by Paolo A. Rossi (1966).
 Reflections by Pasqualino Falasca, with permission of author, in Italian.

1878 births
1966 deaths
Politicians from New York City
Italian emigrants to the United States
American bankers